Turzo is a hamlet located in the municipality of Valle de Sedano, in Burgos province, Castile and León, Spain. As of 2020, it has a population of 6.

Geography 
Turzo is located 66km north of Burgos.

References

Populated places in the Province of Burgos